Sir Thomas Kay Sidey (27 May 1863 – 20 May 1933) was a New Zealand politician from the Otago region, remembered for his successful advocacy of daylight saving time.

Early life
Sidey was born on 27 May 1863, to John and Johan Murray Sidey, in the Dunedin suburb of Corstorphine. His father had come to wealth during the Otago Gold Rush as a storekeeper. Tom Sidey attended Otago Boys' High School and graduated from the University of Otago with a law degree (LLB) in 1889. In the following decade, he worked as a solicitor.

He married Helena (née Baxter) on 17 June 1903. They had one son.

Political career

 
 
 
 
 
 
 
 
 

Sidey was a member of the Caversham Borough Council. He was elected Mayor of Caversham on three occasions: in 1894, 1899 and 1901.

Sidey was elected to the House of Representatives in the Caversham by-election as an independent liberal in 1901. The by-election was caused by the death of Arthur Morrison. Sidey joined the Liberal Party as part of its left (radical) wing, and stayed with the party until the end.

Sidey represented the Caversham electorate from 1901 to 1908, and then the Dunedin South electorate from 1908 to 1928, when he retired. He was then appointed to the Legislative Council from 1928 until 1933.

Sidey was Attorney-General (1928–31) and Minister of Justice (1930–31) in the United government.

Sidey put forward a private member's bill for putting clocks forward an hour in summer every year from 1909. It was nearly passed in 1915. It was passed in the House of Representatives but rejected by the Legislative Council in 1926. It was finally approved in 1927.

In the 1930 New Year Honours, Sidey was appointed a Knight Bachelor.

Death
Sidey died at home on 20 May 1933. He was survived by his wife and son, Stuart Sidey. His son became Mayor of Dunedin from 1959 to 1965. His widow, Helena, Lady Sidey, was appointed an Officer of the Order of the British Empire for social welfare services, especially in connection with women's organisations, in the 1953 Coronation Honours. The Royal Society of New Zealand awards the T. K. Sidey Medal at irregular intervals for "outstanding scientific research".

References

|-

|-

|-

1863 births
1933 deaths
Members of the New Zealand House of Representatives
Independent MPs of New Zealand
New Zealand Liberal Party MPs
New Zealand Knights Bachelor
Attorneys-General of New Zealand
Members of the New Zealand Legislative Council
19th-century New Zealand lawyers
Members of the Cabinet of New Zealand
New Zealand Liberal Party MLCs
New Zealand MPs for Dunedin electorates
Burials at Andersons Bay Cemetery
Unsuccessful candidates in the 1896 New Zealand general election
19th-century New Zealand politicians
New Zealand politicians awarded knighthoods
Chancellors of the University of Otago
Justice ministers of New Zealand